This page describes the qualifying procedure for the 2011 Individual Ice Racing World Championship finals.

The 2011 Individual Ice Racing World Championship events will take place from January to March 2011. The champion will be determined in eight final meetings. A seventeen permanent riders will be determined in three Qualifying Rounds hosted in January.

Qualification system 
In three Qualifying Rounds will started 48 riders from 13 nationan federation and to Final series will qualify top 5 from each meetings and 6th placed riders from QR1 and QR2 as a track reserve during a Final One (Day 1).

Heat details

Qualifying Round One 
  Sankt Johann im Pongau, Salzburg
 15 January 2011
Speedwaystadion (Length: 380 m)
Referee:  Craig Ackroyd
Jury President:  Christer Bergström
References

Qualifying Round Two 
  Sanok, Subcarpathian Voivodeship
 21 January 2011
Stadion "Błonie" (Length: 364 m)
Referee:  Mick Bates
Jury President:  Wolfgang Glas
References      
Change:
Draw 2.  Oleg Dosaev → Reserve 17.

Qualifying Round Three 
  Saalfelden, Salzburg
 22 January 2011
Eis-Oval Lenzing Saalfelden (Length: 367 m)
Referee:  Krister Gardell
Jury President:  Petr Ondrasik
References      
Change:
Draw #4  Antti Aakko → Teppo Toivola
co-organized by the Dutch federation

See also 
 2011 Team Ice Racing World Championship
 2011 Speedway Grand Prix Qualification

References 

Ice speedway competitions
World Individual
Qualification for sports events